World Federation Against Drugs (WFAD) is a group of individuals and non-governmental organizations from different parts of the world (139 organizations in 47 countries in July 2015). The 1st World Forum Against Drugs was hosted in Sweden in 2008 by a group of Swedish non-Government organizations. An outcome of the first forum was the founding of WFAD in 2009 and to organize the 2nd World Forum Against Drugs in 2010. The start of WFAD had, in 2009, moral support from the US President George W Bush 

The aim of WFAD is to work toward a "drug-free" world. The members of WFAD believe that illicit drug use is threatening the existence of stable families, communities and government institutions throughout the world. WFAD has its head office in Stockholm. WFAD opposes legalization of cannabis and other recreational drugs, and opposes injection rooms for heroin addicts. WFAD advocates that nations adhere to the Single Convention on Narcotic Drugs 1961.

The WFAD organized, in 2012, the  World Forum Against Drugs
One of many key speakers at the 3rd World Forums Against Drugs was R. Gil Kerlikowske, U.S. President Barack Obama's "drug czar". At the 3rd World Forum Against Drugs in Stockholm May 2012 was a declaration "for a humane and balanced drug policy" signed by him as representative of the U.S. Government along with representatives of Italy, the Russian Federation, Sweden and the United Kingdom.  

WFAD continue to organize international conferences about drug policy.

References

External links
 

Drug control law
Drug policy